Kiên Hải is a rural district (huyện) of Kiên Giang province in the Mekong Delta region of Vietnam. The district consists of 23 islands, of which 11 are inhabited, the main economy is fishing, aquaculture and tourism.

According to 2009 census, the district has a population of 20,807. The district covers an area of 28 km². The district capital lies at Hon Tre island. The district contains parts of the archipelago of the Bà Lụa Islands and Nam Du Islands.

The district includes four communes - Hòn Tre, Lại Sơn, An Sơn and Nam Du.

References

Districts of Kiên Giang province